The Impossible City: A Hong Kong Memoir is a 2022 memoir by Karen Cheung, published by Random House.

The book documents her growing up in Hong Kong and her familial relationships, as well the beginning of her interest in politics during the Umbrella Movement and scenes of counterculture.

Contents
The book's narrative begins in 1997, when Hong Kong has its sovereignty transferred to China during the Handover of Hong Kong. At the time Cheung was age four; she was born in Shenzhen but went back to Hong Kong shortly afterward. She attended first an international school and then a government-funded school after her family's financial situation deteriorated.

The narrative ends when the Hong Kong National Security Law is imposed on 1 July 2020.

Reception
Kirkus Reviews described it as "A powerful memoir of love and anguish".

Publishers Weekly stated that the strongest sections were the "personal missives about city life" and that the work is "a riveting portrait of a place that’s as captivating as it is confounding."

The book has been longlisted for the 2023 Andrew Carnegie Medal for Excellence in Nonfiction.

References

External links
 The Impossible City - On Karen Cheung's website
 The Impossible City - Penguin Random House
 The Impossible City - Random House Books

Books about Hong Kong
2022 non-fiction books
Random House books